Palagnedra is a village and a locality part of the municipality of Centovalli in the district of Locarno in the canton of Ticino in Switzerland. Lago di Palagnedra is located below the village, on the Melezza river.

History

Palagnedra is first mentioned in 1379 as Pallagnidrio.

During the Middle Ages, Palagnedra was the administrative and religious center in the 13th Century Centovalli valley community.  In the 16th Century it became part of the Locarno and Ascona region, followed by the bailiwick of Locarno.  In 1864 the village became independent.

The church of San Michele was built between 1640-1732 and renovated in 1964-66 and again between 1999 and 2001.  It was the mother church of the Centovalli valley and contains the best preserved late gothic cycle of frescoes by Antonio da Tradate.

Traditionally the local economy was based around agriculture and grazing.  Starting in the 16th Century some of the income came from the seasonal migration to Italy.  Initially, most of the seasonal workers were laborers.  This changed in the 19th Century to cooks going to Tuscany.  Until the 1950s, the vicinity of the Italian Swiss border encouraged smuggling.  In 1950-52 a hydroelectric dam was built.  In 2005 about a third of the jobs in Palagnedra related to the agricultural sector.

On 25 October 2009  the municipalities of Borgnone, Intragna and Palagnedra merged into the municipality of Centovalli.

A large part of the community of Palagnedra is formed by the notorious family name "Mazzi"

Location

The former municipality is located in the Locarno district on a terrace on the southern slope of the Centovalli.  It includes various districts, including Bordei, Bolade and Crup.

Historic population
The historical population is given in the following table:

References

Former municipalities of Ticino